This list of Usagi Yojimbo stories features stories from the Usagi Yojimbo comic book..

Fantagraphics series

Mirage series

Dark Horse series

IDW series

Limited Series

One Shots

Short stories

Space Usagi

References

Stories
Usagi Yojimbo Stories